The M60 105 mm howitzer cartridge is a U.S. artillery shell that carried a chemical agent, specifically one of the sulfur mustard agents.

References

Chemical weapon delivery systems
Artillery shells
Chemical weapons of the United States